is a tennis arcade game which was released by Namco in 1992 worldwide; it runs on Namco NA-1 hardware, and as the name suggests, it is the sequel to Pro Tennis: World Court which was released four years earlier. At the start of the game, players must select either "singles" (1P vs CPU/2P) or "doubles" (1P & CPU/2P vs 3P/CPU & 4P/CPU) - they will then have to select one of sixteen new players and select one of the four new courts (USA hard, France clay, GB grass, and Namco funny). The players must then decide whether they want their match to be one or three sets long; the company's signature character, Pac-Man, also makes a cameo appearance upon the Namco court. A timer counts down from a maximum of 360 seconds (depending on how the cabinet has been set) in the top-right corner of the screen; if it has run out by the time a set has been won, the players will have to insert another coin within ten seconds if they wish to continue playing, because if they do not, the losing player (or team, if three or four players) shall immediately forfeit the game.

Reception 
In Japan, Game Machine listed Super World Court on their May 1, 1993 issue as being the eighteenth most-successful table arcade game of the month.

References

External links

Super World Court at the Arcade History database

1992 video games
Arcade video games
Arcade-only video games
Namco arcade games
Tennis video games
Video game sequels
Video games developed in Japan